Shahrizor or Shahrazur is a region part of Kurdistan Region, Iraq situated in the Sulaymaniyah Governorate and west of Avroman. Shahrizor is a fertile plain watered by the tributaries of Tandjaro river which flows to Diyala and Tigris rivers.

Etymology
Herzfeld based on the fact that in classical sources the name was spelt with an initial /s/ rather /sh/, suggested white forest, which he connected with the Avestan legends. Indeed, to this day the plain of Sharazur has an important status among adherents of native religion of Yarsan as a holy and sacred region where God descends for the Last Judgement. The 12th century geographer Yaqut al-Hamawi, based on folk etymology interpreted origin of name Sharazur, from the name of the son of Zahhak, whom he mentions as founder of the famous city of Sharazor.

History

Extensive archaeological research, especially since 2009, at sites like Bakr Awa, Tell Begum, Gird-î Qalrakh, and Bestansur (which is on the UNESCO World Heritage Tentative List), has shown that the plain has been continuously occupied since prehistoric times.

Billerbeck states that that Sharizor was part of Zamua during the Assyrian era and populated by the Lullubi during the rule of Assurnasirbal II. Arabs associated Shahrizor with biblical legends associated with Saul and David suggesting that the region had a Jewish colony.

Sharazor and its king Yazdan Kard are mentioned in the Karnamag, a book of Persian mythology, of Ardashir I and also in the inscription of Narseh alongside Garmian. During the Sassanid era the region of Sharazor was one of the 5 provinces of the satrapy of Medes, an ancient Iranian people.

In the 4th century, some of inhabitants of Sharazor who had converted to Christianity were persecuted by the Sassanids. Among the prominent examples of this persecution is the killing of Bishop Shahdost Shahrazori and 128 of his followers.

Sharazur was incorporated into Ardalan Principality from 11th century until the 16th and was its first capital. Its relics are the historic site of Yassin tepe. It formed afterwards part of Baban Principality.

In the Medieval era, the area was incorporated into the territories ruled by many dynasties, including Annazid, Aishanid and also Ayyubid, who were also of Kurdish origins. During the Ayyubid period the region, and the city of Erbil, were granted as a fief to the emir Gökböri by Saladin in 1190.

Yaqut al-Hamawi describes the region of Sharazor as areas between Erbil to the west and Hamadan to the east including many cities, towns and villages.  He mentions the inhabitants of the region as having been entirely Kurds, who were defended themselves from the Sultan and ruled their area.

See also
Al-Shahrazuri – 13th-century physician, historian and philosopher
Khâlid-i Shahrazuri
Kirkuk Governorate
Sharazoor District
As Sulaymaniyah Governorate

References

External links
 Kirkuk Journal
 Kirkuk City, part 1
 Kirkuk City, part 2

Plains of Iraq
Geography of Iraqi Kurdistan